The Mistress of Shenstone is a 1921 silent film romance directed by Henry King and starring Pauline Frederick and Roy Stewart based upon the 1910 novel by Florence L. Barclay.

It is a surviving film but in an abridged version in a Spanish archive, Filmoteca de Catalunya.

Cast
Pauline Frederick as Lady Myra Ingleby
Roy Stewart as Jim Airth
Emmett King as Sir Deryck Brand (credited as Emmett C. King)
Arthur Clayton as Ronald Ingram
John Willink as Billy Cathcart
Helen Wright as Margaret O'Mara
Rosa Gore as Amelia Murgatroyd
Helen Muir as Eliza Murgatroyd
Lydia Yeamans Titus as Susannah Murgatroyd

References

External links

The Pauline Frederick Web Page by Greta de Groat
lantern slide (Wayback Machine)

1921 films
American silent feature films
Films directed by Henry King
Films based on British novels
Film Booking Offices of America films
American black-and-white films
American romance films
1920s romance films
Films set in England
1920s American films